Barrington is a locality and small rural community in the local government area of Kentish in the North West region of Tasmania.
The 2016 census determined a population of 197 for the state suburb of Barrington.

History
The name “Barrington” was originally applied to a parish in or before 1855. It was gazetted as a locality in 1965.

Geography
The Forth River, forms the south-western and western boundaries, while the Don River forms most of the eastern boundary.

Road infrastructure
The B14 route (Sheffield Road) enters the locality from the north and exits to the south-east. The C143 route (Barrington Road) starts at an intersection with route B14 and exits to the south.

References

Localities of Kentish Council
Towns in Tasmania